Pedro Ortiz (born 26 February 1956) is a Colombian long-distance runner. He competed in the men's marathon at the 1988 Summer Olympics.

References

1956 births
Living people
Athletes (track and field) at the 1988 Summer Olympics
Colombian male long-distance runners
Colombian male marathon runners
Olympic athletes of Colombia
Place of birth missing (living people)
20th-century Colombian people